Stillfront Group is a Sweden-based company specialized in the acquisition and management of mobile and browser game studios.

History 
Stillfront was founded in 2010 by Jörgen Larsson, a Swedish entrepreneur, although it didn't start operating until 2012. The plan was to build a diversified portfolio of long life-cycle games by acquiring independent gaming studios and letting these operate independently within the same group. Stillfronts main markets are the US, Germany, France and the Middle East. The company is mainly focused on free-2-play mobile games.

In November 2012, Stillfront acquired Power Challenge, a mobile and browser-based social sports management game developer and publisher.

In November 2013 Stillfront announced it had acquired 51% of Bytro Labs and entered into an agreement to acquire the remaining 49% by 2016. The addition of Bytro further expanded Stillfront’s games portfolio with titles such as Supremacy 1914, PanzerWars and Industry Tycoon and strengthened the company within the strategy game genre.

In December 2015, Stillfront completed an IPO and listed its shares on NASDAQ First North Stockholm. The listing price was SEK 39 per share and the first day of trading was December 8, 2015.

In June 2016, Stillfront announced its acquisition of the majority of shares in Simutronics, one of the longest-running independent game development studios in North America. Simutronics developed MUD-style text-based games GemStone IV and DragonRealms, as well as mobile games Tiny Heroes, One Epic Knight and Lara Croft Relic Run.

In December 2016, Stillfront acquired Babil Games, a Middle East and North Africa (MENA) region mobile games publisher.

In May 2017, Stillfront Group acquired eRepublik Labs, adding game titles like eRepublik, Age of Lords and World at War: WW2 Strategy MMO to the group.

In June the same year, the listing of Stillfront’s shares was moved to NASDAQ First North Premier Growth Market.

In January 2018, Stillfront completed the acquisition of Goodgame Studios for €270 million.

In October the same year, Stillfront acquired Imperia Online, a game developer and publisher in Southeastern Europe with focus on long term gamer relations.

Further, in December 2018, Stillfront acquired Playa Games, a casual strategy game developer and publisher in Germany.

During the summer of 2019, Stillfront acquired Kixeye, a developer and publisher of massively multiplayer online real-time strategy games (MMORTS) for PC and mobile devices.

In January 2020, Stillfront announced the acquisition of Storm8, a mobile mash-up game developer headquartered in California for up to $400 million.

In January 2021, Stillfront announced its intent to acquire Hong Kong based mobile game publisher 6waves, including purchasing the 34.8% stake previously owned by Nexon for $93 million, for a grand total of $201 million.

On September 9, 2021, Stillfront acquired Arabic online card game company Jawaker for $205 million.

In January 2022, Stillfront acquired 6waves for $201M.

Studios

References 

Swedish companies established in 2010
Video game companies established in 2010
Video game companies of Sweden